The Dongkha la or Donkia Pass() (el. ) is a high mountain pass in the Himalaya connecting Sikkim in India with Tibet.

Located in North Sikkim, the pass offers a view of the Tibetan Plateau.

The first observer to record the pass in western literature was botanist Joseph Dalton Hooker, who crossed the pass on 7September 1849.

References

External links
Mountain passes of Sikkim

Mountain passes of Sikkim
Mountain passes of Tibet
Mountain passes of China
Mountain passes of India
Mountain passes of the Himalayas
China–India border crossings
Mangan district